Jack Miller (born 28 November 1994) is a rugby league footballer who plays as a  or  for the Newcastle Thunder in the RFL Championship.

Career
Miller played for amateur team, Smallthorne Panthers, before signing an academy contract with the Huddersfield Giants in 2011. In May 2013 he played for the England Academy side in a 52–18 win against the French under-18 team in Bordeaux.

Two months previously, Miller signed a two-year contract with Huddersfield and was promoted to the first team. His first team debut was on 7 September 2013 when he started as scrum-half in the final round of Super League XVIII against the Bradford Bulls. Miller and fellow debutant, Jake Connor scored Huddersfield's only points in a 58–6 defeat, Miller converting Connor's try.

Although Miller was named in Huddersfield's first team squad for 2014, he did not play any first team games during the season and was released by Huddersfield at the end of the season.

Miller travelled to Australia to join the Queanbeyan Kangaroos in the Canberra Raiders Cup. In his first season in Australia he was the winner of the McIntyre Medal as the league's first-grade player of the year.  In his second season the Queanbeyan Kangaroos won the minor premiership in the Canberra Raiders Cup.

After two seasons in Australia, Miller returned to England and signed for League One side Doncaster in October 2016. During the 2017 and 2018 seasons Miller made 28 appearances for Doncaster scoring eight tries and kicking 95 goals.

In October 2018 Miller made the move from South Yorkshire to West Yorkshire to join fellow League One side, Keighley Cougars.  The Cougars top-try scorer in his first season, Miller has been ever present since 2021 scoring in every game in 2021 and 2022. Appointed captain at Keighley for 2022, Miller led the Cougars through a unbeaten league campaign as the team became 2022 League One Champions. In both the 2021 and 2022 seasons, Miller has been the League One top-goal scorer and top-points scorer.

Miller left Keighley to join Newcastle three weeks into the 2023 season.

References

External links

Living people

1994 births
Keighley Cougars captains
Keighley Cougars players
Doncaster R.L.F.C. players
Huddersfield Giants players
Newcastle Thunder players
Rugby league halfbacks
Rugby league five-eighths